Enste may refer to:
A German name
A noble dynasty from the Sauerland
Enste, North Rhine-Westphalia